Gemma Fox is an English UK garage, R&B and hip hop singer, song writer best known for her 2004 album Messy. The lead single, "Girlfriend's Story", was released in April of that year and featured MC Lyte. The second single, "Gone", featured Juelz Santana. Fox left her label Polydor Records in August 2004. She was a member of the collective Aftershock alongside Terror Danjah, Mz Bratt, Bruza, Triple Threat, Elrae, D-E-Velopment, Badness, and 2Nice. The collective was formed in 2003.
 
Fox won a UMA and was nominated for a MOBO Award in 2004.

Discography

Albums
Messy – 2004

Singles

 So Messy      Paleface

Boxers    Shaun DEAN New Sate Records

Time      Jamie Duggan and DJ Corrupt UK     wired audio

Girlfriend Remix       Jamie Duggan and DJ Corrupt uk wired Audio 

Veins      Shapes   Circus Records

Awake                  Happy Records

Operator     Hand Glader      Night bass

References

English women singers
Living people
Year of birth missing (living people)
Bassline musicians
UK garage singers
British contemporary R&B singers
Place of birth missing (living people)